Sircilla (also spelled as Siricilla/Sirsilla) is a town and the district headquarters of Rajanna Sircilla district in the Indian state of Telangana. It is located on the banks of Manair river in the Sircilla mandal of Sircilla revenue division. It is popularly known as Textile Town due to the presence of large number of power looms, textile processing and dyeing units. It is the biggest textile hub in the state of Telangana with over 40,000 power looms. Sircilla, along with Warangal is proposed to be developed as a mega textile zone by the Telangana government. The first Visalandhra Mahasabha in Telangana was held at Sircilla during the Visalandhra movement.

Geography 
It has an average elevation of 322 metres (1056 feet). By road, it is located 120 km north of Secunderabad, 40 km west of Karimnagar, 30 km north of Siddipet and 56 km east of Kamareddy. It is 10 km away from the historic Vemulawada temple town.

Governance

Sircilla Municipality was constituted in 1952 and is now classified as a first grade municipality with 34 election wards.

Transport

Road
A new national highway numbered NH 365B connects Sircilla with different district headquarters of the state Suryapet-Jangaon-Siddipet-Sircilla.

Railway
Manoharabad Kothapalli new broad gauge line under brisk construction connects the town with Secunderabad, Karimnagar, Gajwel, Siddipet and Manoharabad.

Demographics 
 census, the town has a population of 92,910 within the municipal limits of 55.47 km2 area. 
Hindus form the majority religious group with 92% of the population, followed by 6%  Muslims and 2% others.

Telugu is the most widely spoken language. Urdu is spoken among the Muslim communities.

Economy 
Sircilla economy is largely driven by textile industry with presence of numerous textile and textile-allied industries spread across the town and nearby villages. It is also the main commercial center for trade and commerce in the district. The town is also a major education and healthcare hub of the region. The town has a sprawling Textile park nearby, an apparel park for garments industry with companies like Shoppers stop, Gokuldas Image, etc. setting up their manufacturing units. Starting 2018, Telangana government is giving orders to manufacture 1 crore meters of Bathumma Sarees worth 350 crore rupees a year. The town is now a bustling town with strong economy in Telangana. The town also has various major tourists places in proximity, like Sri Rajarajeshwara temple, Sri Rajarajeshwara Mid Manair reservoir, Ananthagiri reservoir, Malkapet reservoir, Peddamma jungle, etc.

Education 
There are numerous educational institutions in the town. The town has one of the oldest junior colleges in the state, a government degree and polytechnic college. Jawaharlal Nehru Technological University (JNTU) - Rajanna Sircilla is a government engineering college under Jawaharlal Nehru Technological University, Hyderabad. A Government nursing college for women was inaugurated in 2021. There is also a Government Agricultural polytechnic college, a Government Medical college is proposed to be set up with a teaching hospital. Apart from these there are many private degree and technical institutions in the town.

Politics

Sircilla assembly constituency is a legislative assembly constituency in Telangana.It is represented by K. T. Rama Rao.

Notable people  

 Midde Ramulu – Oggu Katha artist from Hanmajipet village.
 C. Narayana Reddy - Lyricist and the first recipient of Jnanpith Award in Telugu.
 Anabheri Prabhakar Rao – Freedom fighter and major activist of Telangana Rebellion.
 Chennamaneni Rajeshwara Rao – Freedom fighter and six times ex-MLA of Sircilla.
 Chennamaneni Vidyasagar Rao – Entrepreneur, ex-central home minister and former governor of Maharashtra and Tamil Nadu
 Venu - Film actor and comedian.
 Paidi Jairaj - Indian Actor, Director and Producer.

References 

Guduri Seetaram tholi tharam katha rachayita

Cities and towns in Rajanna Sircilla district
Mandal headquarters in Karimnagar district